Phratora is a genus of  leaf beetles. It is synonymous to Phyllodecta . European Phratora species can be distinguished based on morphology of female genitalia., but they differ little in size and body form and most show metallic coloration.

Distribution 
Phratora species are found in the Northern Hemisphere in areas that tend to be cool and moist where their host plants thrive. They are usually found in Northern and Southern Europe, China and Japan, and in Canada and the United States of America.

Host plants 
Species in this genus are of considerable interest to evolutionary ecology researchers because they vary with respect to host plant preference and chemistry of their larval defensive secretions. Phratora species are known to feed on willows (Phratora americana, P. frosti, P. interstitialis, P. tibialis, Phratora vitellinae, Phratora vulgatissima, P. polaris, P. purpurea), poplars (Phratora laticollis, P. atrovirens, Phratora vitellinae, P. purpurea), or birch (P. polaris in Lapland, Phratora hudsonia), and their host plant use is evolutionarily conserved in that closely related beetle species tend to feed on more closely related plant species.

Natural enemies 
Predators of Phratora eggs include A. nemorum, Orthotylus marginalisand the syrphid fly Parasyrphus nigritarsis. Larval predators include A. nemorum, the bug Rhacognathus punctatus,  and the wasp Symmorphus bifasciatus. Adult beetles are consumed by R. punctatus. More information about natural enemies can be found in the articles about Phratora laticollis, Phratora vitellinae and Phratora vulgatissima.

Larval defense secretions 
The mechanism of larval defensive secretion production, its relationship to host plant preference, and its evolutionary significance has been studied. The secretions can repel natural enemies or conspecifics. More information about larval secretions can be found in the articles about Phratora laticollis and Phratora vitellinae.

Economic Importance 
Some species (especially Phratora vulgatissima) are considered pests when populations build up in willow plantations.

Species
These 16 species belong to the genus Phratora:

 Phratora americana (Schaeffer, 1928) i c g b
 Phratora antennaria (Apfelbeck, 1912) g
 Phratora atrovirens (Cornelius, 1857) g
 Phratora californica Brown, 1961 i c g
 Phratora frosti Brown, 1951 i c g
 Phratora hudsonia Brown, 1951 i c g b (birch leaf beetle)
 Phratora interstitialis Mannerheim, 1853 i c g b
 Phratora kenaiensis Brown, 1952 i c g
 Phratora koreana Takizawa, 1985 g
 Phratora laticollis (Suffrian, 1851) g
 Phratora polaris (Sparre Schneider, 1886) g
 Phratora purpurea Brown, 1951 i c g b (aspen skeletonizer)
 Phratora similis (Chujo, 1958) g
 Phratora tibialis (Suffrian, 1851) g
 Phratora vitellinae (Linnaeus, 1758) g (brassy leaf beetle)
 Phratora vulgatissima (Linnaeus, 1758) g (blue willow leaf beetle)

Data sources: i = ITIS, c = Catalogue of Life, g = GBIF, b = Bugguide.net

References

Further reading

External links

 
 

Chrysomelinae
Chrysomelidae genera
Taxa named by Louis Alexandre Auguste Chevrolat